Michael James Ferrara (born August 25, 1958) is a retired American basketball player best known for his collegiate career. He was the America East Conference Player of the Year as a senior in 1980–81 while playing for Colgate University. After graduating, Ferrara was selected in the 1981 NBA draft by the Washington Bullets, due to a serious knee injury sustained in the preseason, he never played in the National Basketball Association.

Ferrara grew up in Franklin, New Jersey and starred at Franklin High School.

Ferrara began his career at Niagara University, where after one season he transferred because the head coach who recruited him, Frank Layden, left prior to the start of Ferrara's career. After sitting out a season as a transfer redshirt, Ferrara spent his final three seasons playing for Colgate University. He scored a then-school record 1,763 points (later broken in 1995) and still holds Colgate records for points in a season (772) and steals in a season (94). Ferrara finished as the second leading scorer in all of NCAA Division I in 1980–81 with a 28.6 points per game average and was named the conference's player of the year. His jersey number was retired by Colgate in 2005.

References

1958 births
Living people
American men's basketball players
Basketball players from New Jersey
Basketball players from New York City
Colgate Raiders men's basketball players
Niagara Purple Eagles men's basketball players
People from Franklin, New Jersey
Shooting guards
Sportspeople from Sussex County, New Jersey
Washington Bullets draft picks